Lonny Ray Suko (born 1943) is a senior United States district judge of the United States District Court for the Eastern District of Washington.

Early life and education
Born in Spokane, Washington, Suko received a Bachelor of Arts degree from Washington State University in 1965 and a Juris Doctor from the University of Idaho College of Law in 1968. He was a law clerk for Judge Charles L. Powell, U.S. District Court, Eastern District of Washington from 1968 to 1969.

Career
Suko was in private practice in Yakima, Washington, from 1969 to 1995. He served as a part time United States magistrate judge in the Eastern District of Washington from 1971 to 1991. He served as a full time United States Magistrate Judge in the Eastern District of Washington from 1995 to 2003.

Judicial service
Suko is a United States District Judge of the United States District Court for the Eastern District of Washington. Suko was nominated by President George W. Bush on April 28, 2003, to a seat vacated by William Fremming Nielsen. He was confirmed by the United States Senate on July 15, 2003 and received his commission on July 16, 2003. Suko took senior status on November 1, 2013. As of 2020, Suko is the last judge appointed by a Republican president to the Eastern District of Washington.

References

Sources

|-

1943 births
Living people
21st-century American judges
Judges of the United States District Court for the Eastern District of Washington
Lawyers from Spokane, Washington
United States district court judges appointed by George W. Bush
United States magistrate judges
University of Idaho alumni
Washington (state) lawyers
Washington State University alumni